Vecliepāja (Old Liepāja) is the largest and oldest district in Liepāja, Latvia.

Neighbourhoods in Liepāja